The Nanjing Ladies Open was a tournament for professional female tennis players played on outdoor hard courts at the Nanjing Sport Institute Tennis Academy of China. The event was classified as a $100,000 ITF Women's Circuit tournament. It was held in Nanjing, China, from 2013 to 2015. The event was part of the WTA 125K series in 2013.

Past finals

Singles

Doubles

External links 
 Nanjing Ladies Open at wtatennis.com

 
WTA 125 tournaments
ITF Women's World Tennis Tour
Hard court tennis tournaments
Tennis tournaments in China
Recurring sporting events established in 2013
Recurring sporting events disestablished in 2015
Defunct tennis tournaments in China
Defunct sports competitions in China